Michael Riedel may refer to:

Michael Riedel (artist) (born 1972), German contemporary artist
Michael Riedel (journalist), theater columnist for the New York Post